Carl Harbaugh ( – February 26, 1960) was an American film actor, screenwriter and director.

Biography
On Broadway, Harbaugh performed in The Greyhound (1912) and The Bludgeon (1914).

He was married to Frances Lawson Bouis (? - 1922). Toward the end of his career, he continued to act in the biopic Gentleman Jim (1942), the action picture Northern Pursuit (1943) and the action flick Uncertain Glory (1944). He also appeared in The Far Country (1955) and The Tall Men (1955). Harbaugh last acted in The Revolt of Mamie Stover (1956). 

Harbaugh died on February 26, 1960, at the age of 74 in the Motion Picture Hospital.

Filmography

 Regeneration (1915) - District Attorney Ames
 Carmen (1915) - Escamillo
 The Serpent (1916) - Prince Valanoff
 Big Jim Garrity (1916) - Dawson
 The Test (1916) - Richard Tretman
 Arms and the Woman (1916) - Carl
 The Iron Woman (1916, director)
 When False Tongues Speak (1917) - Fred Walton
 A Rich Man's Plaything (1917, director)
 Other Men's Daughters (1918, director)
 The Other Man's Wife (1919, director)
 Hickville to Broadway (1921, director)
 Bucking the Line (1921, director)
 Big Town Ideas (1921, director)
 Jazzmania (1923) - Gavona
 Lost and Found on a South Sea Island (1923) - Waki
 The Silent Command (1923) - Menchen
 Yes, Yes, Nanette (1925, Short, Writer)
 Wife Tamers (1926, Short, Writer)
 Madame Mystery (1926, Short, Writer)
 Say It with Babies (1926, Short, Writer)
 Thundering Fleas (1926, Short, Writer)
 Along Came Auntie (1926, Short, Writer)
 College (1927) - Crew Coach
 Steamboat Bill, Jr. (1928, Writer)
 The Devil's Brother (1933) - Second Woodchopper (uncredited)
 Just an Echo (1934, Short)
 Klondike Annie (1936) - Port Officer (uncredited)
 The Last Train from Madrid (1937) - Militiaman (uncredited)
 Artists and Models (1937) - King (uncredited)
 Prison Farm (1938) - Guard (uncredited)
 The Texans (1938) - Union Soldier (uncredited)
 Sons of the Legion (1938) - Customer
 St. Louis Blues (1939) - Actor (uncredited)
 I'm from Missouri (1939) - Mule Man (uncredited)
 The Roaring Twenties (1939) - Street-Cleaner (uncredited)
 British Intelligence (1940) - German Soldier (uncredited)
 Tear Gas Squad (1940) - Policeman (uncredited)
 They Drive by Night (1940) - Mechanic (uncredited)
 High Sierra (1941) - Fisherman (uncredited)
 The Strawberry Blonde (1941) - Workman (uncredited)
 The Great Mr. Nobody (1941) - Bartender (uncredited)
 Manpower (1941) - Noisy Nash (uncredited)
 They Died with Their Boots On (1941) - Sergeant (uncredited)
 Desperate Journey (1942) - German Soldier (uncredited)
 Gentleman Jim (1942) - Smith (uncredited)
 Background to Danger (1943) - Butler (uncredited)
 Northern Pursuit (1943) - Radio Operator (uncredited)
 Uncertain Glory (1944) - Innkeeper (uncredited)
 Salty O'Rourke (1945) - Waiter (uncredited)
 The Horn Blows at Midnight (1945) - Tipsy Gent (uncredited)
 San Antonio (1945) - Cowman (uncredited)
 The Man I Love (1947) - Bartender (uncredited)
 Pursued (1947) - Bartender (uncredited)
 Cheyenne (1947) - Bartender (uncredited)
 Silver River (1948) - Blake (uncredited)
 Fighter Squadron (1948) - Cockney (uncredited)
 One Sunday Afternoon (1948) - Ship's Officer (uncredited)
 Colorado Territory (1949) - Brakeman (uncredited)
 White Heat (1949) - Foreman (uncredited)
 The Daughter of Rosie O'Grady (1950) - Joe, Stage Doorman (uncredited)
 Storm Warning (1951) - Townsman (uncredited)
 Lullaby of Broadway (1951) - Doorman (uncredited)
 Along the Great Divide (1951) - Jerome (uncredited)
 Distant Drums (1951) - M. Duprez (uncredited)
 Glory Alley (1952) - Waiter (uncredited)
 The World in His Arms (1952) - Seaman (uncredited)
 Blackbeard the Pirate (1952) - Helmsman (uncredited)
 The Lawless Breed (1953) - Drunk (uncredited)
 Gun Fury (1953) - The Barber (uncredited)
 The Far Country (1954) - Sourdough (uncredited)
 Battle Cry (1955) - New Zealander in Bar (uncredited)
 The Tall Men (1955) - Salesman (uncredited)
 The Revolt of Mamie Stover (1956) - Minor Role (uncredited)
 Band of Angels (1957) - Seaman (uncredited)

References

External links

 
 Moving Picture World (US) May 25 1918, pg. 1160, "George Now a Fox Director"

1960 deaths
American male film actors
American male screenwriters
American film directors
20th-century American male actors
20th-century American male writers
20th-century American screenwriters
1880s births